Halton railway station may refer to:

 Halton railway station (Cheshire), on the Birkenhead Joint Railway
 Halton railway station (Lancashire), on the Midland Railway's "Little" North Western Railway